Mary (1931) is a British-German thriller film, directed by Alfred Hitchcock, and is the German language version of Hitchcock's Murder! (1930), shot simultaneously on the same sets with German speaking actors. The film is based on the 1928 book Enter Sir John by Clemence Dane and Helen Simpson, and stars Alfred Abel and Olga Tschechowa. Miles Mander reprises his role as Gordon Druce from Murder!, though the character's name was changed to Gordon Moore.

Plot 
Mary Baring (renamed Diana in the English version) is a member of a touring acting troupe. When she is found one day with no memory next to the corpse of a colleague, all circumstances point to the fact that she committed the crime. At the murder trial, theater producer, writer and actor Sir John Menier is the only juror who has doubts about her guilt to the end. However, he bowed to pressure from the rest of the jury and finally voted guilty.

Driven by his bad conscience, Sir John sets out on his own to find the real culprit. He also feels complicit in her conviction, as it turns out he has known Mary, who once applied to be an actress at his theater - but he turned her down. With two assistants, an acting couple from Mary's troupe, he investigates and comes across Handel Fane, an actor and acrobat with transvestite tendencies who was engaged to Mary. Mary must not know his dark secret that he is an escaped convict (Fane is a mulatto in the original) who must expect to be caught again at any time. When the common colleague wanted to tell her, Fane killed her.

Since Sir John has no idea of this motive, but assumes that he is the perpetrator despite the lack of evidence, he wants to corner Fane. He lets him audition for a supposed new play. The text to be presented has clear references to the Mary Baring case. Fane panics and leaves Sir John's office. At a circus performance, which Sir John visits to question Fane again, the latter commits suicide while performing a trapeze stunt. He leaves a written confession. Mary Baring is thus free. She is picked up from prison by Sir John in a car. (The original ends with Mary and Sir John performing together at his theatre.)

Cast
Alfred Abel as Sir John Menier
Olga Tschechowa as Mary Baring
Paul Graetz as Bobby Brown
Lotte Stein as Bebe Brown
Hermine Sterler  as Miss Miller
Ekkehard Arendt as Handel Fane
Miles Mander as Gordon Moore
John Mylong as John Stuart

Copyright and home video status
Mary, like all of Hitchcock's other British films, is copyrighted worldwide but has been heavily bootlegged on home video. Despite this, various licensed, restored releases have appeared on DVD, Blu-ray, and video on demand from Optimum in the UK, Lionsgate and Kino Lorber in the US, and many others.

References

External links
 
 Alfred Hitchcock Collectors’ Guide: Mary at Brenton Film

1931 films
Films of the Weimar Republic
Films directed by Alfred Hitchcock
British black-and-white films
German black-and-white films
1930s German-language films
German multilingual films
British multilingual films
1931 multilingual films
1930s German films